Nathaniel Lammons and Jackson Withrow were the defending champions but chose not to defend their title.

Robert Galloway and Hans Hach Verdugo won the title after defeating Ezekiel Clark and Alfredo Perez 3–6, 6–3, [10–5] in the final.

Seeds

Draw

References

External links
 Main draw

Champaign-Urbana Challenger - Doubles
2022 Doubles